This is a list of player transfers involving Premiership Rugby teams before or during the 2020–21 season. The list is of deals that are confirmed and are either from or to a rugby union team in the Premiership during the 2019–20 season. It is not unknown for confirmed deals to be cancelled at a later date. On 19 January 2020, Saracens are automatically relegated to the RFU Championship due to salary cap breaches. On 2 April 2020, Newcastle Falcons were automatically promoted back to the Premiership to replace relegated Saracens under the RFU's 'best record playing formula' and due to the COVID-19 pandemic.

Bath

Players In
 Gabriel Hamer-Webb promoted from Academy
 Juan Schoeman from  Sharks
 Ben Spencer from  Saracens
 Will Spencer from  Leicester Tigers
 Will Muir from  England Sevens 
 Alex Gray from  Atlanta Falcons 
 Jamie Bhatti from  Edinburgh
 Tian Schoeman from  Cheetahs 
 Jacques du Toit from  Cheetahs 
 Jaco Coetzee from  Stormers 
 Danny Cipriani from  Gloucester

Players Out
 Sam Nixon to  Bayonne
 Rhys Webb to  Ospreys
 Rhys Davies to  Ospreys
 Francois Louw retired
 Freddie Burns to  Toyota Industries Shuttles
 Chris Cook to  Bristol Bears
 Jackson Willison to  Soyaux Angoulême
 Lucas Noguera Paz released
 Jack Davies to  Doncaster Knights
 Tom Homer to  London Irish
 Alex Davies to  Rosslyn Park
 Levi Davis to  Ealing Trailfinders
 Aled Brew to  Scarlets
 Matt Garvey to  Gloucester
 Nathan Catt retired 
 Levi Douglas to  Wasps 
 Will Britton to  Doncaster Knights
 Darren Atkins to  Jersey Reds (season-long loan)
 Max Green to  Jersey Reds (season-long loan)

Bristol Bears

Players In
 Semi Radradra from  Bordeaux
 Kyle Sinckler from  Harlequins
 Mitch Eadie from  Northampton Saints
 Ben Earl from  Saracens (season-long loan)
 Max Malins from  Saracens (season-long loan)
 Chris Cook from  Bath
 Ratu Naulago from  Hull FC
 Will Capon promoted from Academy
 James Dun promoted from Academy
 Charlie Powell promoted from Academy
 Bryan Byrne from  Leinster
 Tom Kessell from  Coventry
 Niyi Adeolokun from  Connacht
 Peter McCabe from  Connacht
 Nahuel Tetaz Chaparro from  Jaguares
 Stephen Kerins from  Connacht (short-term loan)
 Jake Kerr from  Leicester Tigers

Players Out
 Jordan Crane retired
 Aly Muldowney retired
 Mat Protheroe to  Ospreys
 Nicky Thomas to  Ospreys
 Ian Madigan to  Ulster
 Nic Stirzaker to  Montauban
 Joe Batley to  Worcester Warriors
 Tom Lindsay retired
 Ryan Edwards released
 Luke Daniels to  Ealing Trailfinders
 Ollie Dawe to  Jersey Reds
 Lewis Thiede to  Ealing Trailfinders
 Sam Graham to  Doncaster Knights
 Shaun Malton to  Ealing Trailfinders
 Luke Hamilton to  Oyonnax
 Kieron Assiratti returned to  Cardiff Blues
 Adrian Choat to  Auckland 
 James Lay to  Auckland 
 Jordan Lay to  Bay of Plenty 
 Freddie Owsley to  Edinburgh

Exeter Chiefs

Players In
 Jonny Gray from  Glasgow Warriors
 Sam Hidalgo-Clyne from  Lyon
 Aaron Hinkley from  Gloucester
 Corey Baldwin from  Scarlets
 Josh Hodge from  Newcastle Falcons
 Jack Walsh from  NSW Waratahs
 Facundo Cordero from  Ceibos
 Maks van Dyk from  Harlequins 
 Max Northcote-Green from  London Royals

Players Out
 Nic White to  Brumbies
 Enrique Pieretto to  Glasgow Warriors
 Sam Hill to  Sale Sharks
 Matt Kvesic to  Worcester Warriors
 Josh Caulfield to  Cornish Pirates
 James McRae to  Cornish Pirates
 Max Bodilly to  Ealing Trailfinders
 Greg Holmes to  Western Force
 Phil Dollman retired
 Gareth Steenson retired
 Flynn Elworthy released
 Sam Morley released
 Pierre Thompson released
 Pete Laverick to  Valley 
 Stan South to  Brive 
 Dave Dennis to  LA Giltinis
 Maks van Dyk to  Worcester Warriors (short-term loan)
 Maks van Dyk to  Pau (short-term deal)
 Max Northcote-Green to  Ealing Trailfinders (short-term deal)

Gloucester

Players In
 Louis Rees-Zammit promoted from Academy
 Jordy Reid from  Ealing Trailfinders
 Jack Singleton from  Saracens 
 Jonny May from  Leicester Tigers
 Matías Alemanno from  Jaguares
 Cameron Jordan from  Leicester Tigers
 Matt Garvey from  Bath
 Kyle Moyle from  Cornish Pirates
 Jay Tyack from  Cornish Pirates (short-term loan)
 Jamie Gibson from  Northampton Saints
 Ollie Atkins from  Western Force
 Santiago Carreras from  Jaguares
 Giorgi Kveseladze from  Armanzi Marneuli
 Seb Nagle-Taylor from  Hartpury University (short-term loan)
 Santiago Socino from  Jaguares 
 Conor Maguire from  Dragons

Players Out
 Callum Braley to  Benetton
 Aaron Hinkley to  Exeter Chiefs
 Simon Linsell to  Ealing Trailfinders
 Franco Marais to  NTT DoCoMo Red Hurricanes
 Tom Marshall to  NTT DoCoMo Red Hurricanes
 Owen Williams to  NTT DoCoMo Red Hurricanes
 Franco Mostert to  Honda Heat
 Gerbrandt Grobler to  Stade Français
 Ruan Dreyer to  Lions
 Harry Fry to  Dragons
 Josh Hohneck to  Otago
 Danny Drake returned to  Scarlets
 Logovi'i Mulipola returned to  Newcastle Falcons 
 Charlie Beckett to  Ampthill 
 James Hanson to  Melbourne Rebels
 Tom Hudson to  Ampthill (season-long loan)
 Danny Cipriani to  Bath
 Corné Fourie released
 Henry Trinder to  Vannes 
 Todd Gleave to  Ospreys (season-long loan)

Harlequins

Players In
 Andre Esterhuizen from  Sharks
 Wilco Louw from  Stormers
 Joe Gray from  Saracens
 Tyrone Green from  Lions
 Joe Marchant returned from  Blues
 Matas Jurevicius from  London Scottish
 Jordan Els from  Ealing Trailfinders
 Scott Steele from  London Irish
 Craig Trenier from  Ealing Trailfinders
 Mak Wilson from  Southern Knights
 Lewis Gjaltema from  North Harbour 
 Will Edwards from  England Sevens (short-term deal)
 Richard de Carpentier from  England Sevens (short-term deal)
 Luke Wallace from  Leicester Tigers

Players Out
 Nick Auterac to  Northampton Saints
 Kyle Sinckler to  Bristol Bears
 Phil Swainston to  Rouen
 Francis Saili to  Biarritz
 Travis Ismaiel to  Bulls
 Toby Freeman to  London Scottish
 Semi Kunatani to  Castres
 Rob Buchanan retired
 Chris Robshaw to  San Diego Legion
 Max Crumpton retired
 Vereniki Goneva to  Mont-de-Marsan 
 Mark Lambert retired
 Renaldo Bothma released
 James Bourton released
 Luke James released
 Niall Saunders retired
 Lloyd Wheeldon released
 Gabriel Ibitoye to  Agen
 Harry Barlow to  New England Free Jacks
 Jack Clifford retired
 Tom Penny to  Newcastle Falcons
 Marc Thomas to  Worcester Warriors
 Maks van Dyk to  Exeter Chiefs 
 Chris Ashton to  Worcester Warriors

Leicester Tigers

Players In
 Zack Henry from  Nevers
 Shalva Mamukashvili from  Ensei-STM
 Nemani Nadolo from  Montpellier
 Cyle Brink from  Lions
 Ollie Chessum from  Nottingham
 Dan Kelly from  Loughborough Students
 Cameron Henderson from  Glasgow Warriors
 Matt Scott from  Edinburgh
 Harry Potter from  Melbourne Rebels
 Blake Enever from  Brumbies
 Matías Moroni from  Jaguares
 Kini Murimurivalu from  La Rochelle
 Guy Porter from  Brumbies
 Kobus van Wyk from  Hurricanes
 Luke Wallace from  Coventry
 Jasper Wiese from  Cheetahs
 Ryan Bower from  Worcester Warriors
 Joaquín Díaz Bonilla from  Jaguares 
 Richard Wigglesworth from  Saracens 
 Luan de Bruin from  Cheetahs 
 David Williams from  Nottingham (season-long loan)
 Julián Montoya from  Jagaures 
 Will Hurd from  Glasgow Warriors
 Darryl Marfo from  Ospreys (short-term deal)
 Nic Dolly from  Coventry

Players Out
 Sam Costelow to  Scarlets
 Jonny May to  Gloucester
 Joe Batley returned to  Bristol Bears
 Ifereimi Boladau returned to  Nottingham
 Sam Eveleigh released
 Leo Gilliland released
 Rory Hughes returned to  Glasgow Warriors
 Adam Thompstone released
 Jimmy Stevens retired
 Jonah Holmes to  Dragons
 Will Spencer to  Bath
 Guy Thompson to  Ealing Trailfinders
 Owen Hills to  Nottingham
 Telusa Veainu to  Stade Français
 Gaston Cortes to  Toronto Arrows
 Noel Reid to  Agen
 Manu Tuilagi to  Sale Sharks
 EW Viljoen to  Lions
 Sione Kalamafoni to  Scarlets
 Cameron Jordan to  Gloucester
 Tatafu Polota-Nau to  Parramatta Two Blues 
 Kyran Bungaroo to  Trelissac
 Keston Lines to  Coventry 
 Andy Forsyth returned to  Coventry
 Rory Jennings returned to  Coventry
 Greg Bateman to  Dragons 
 Joe Thomas to  Dragons
 Jordan Taufua to  Lyon
 Blake Enever released 
 Facundo Gigena to  London Irish
 Shalva Mamukashvili released
 Jordan Olowofela to  Western Force (season-long loan)
 George Worth to  Melbourne Rebels (season-long loan)
 Kyle Eastmond to  Leeds Rhinos
 Tom Hardwick released
 Jake Kerr to  Bristol Bears
 Luke Wallace to  Harlequins

London Irish

Players In

 Tom Homer from  Bath
 Matt Cornish from  Ealing Trailfinders
 Charlton Kerr from  England Sevens
 Rob Simmons from  NSW Waratahs
 Agustín Creevy from  Jaguares
 Phil Cokanasiga promoted from Academy
 Ollie Hassell-Collins promoted from Academy
 Andrei Mahu from  Krasny Yar 
 Bill Meakes from  Melbourne Rebels (short-term deal)
 Facundo Gigena from  Leicester Tigers
 Vladimir Podrezov from  VVA Saracens
 Nic Groom from  Edinburgh

Players Out
 Belgium Tuatagaloa to  Rouen
 Barney Maddison to  Ealing Trailfinders
 Wil Partington to  Hartpury University
 Danny Hobbs-Awoyemi to  Northampton Saints
 Jack Belcher released
 Pat Cilliers released
 Saia Fainga'a released
 Finlay Rossiter released
 Franco van der Merwe released
 Alivereti Veitokani released
 Dave Porecki to  NSW Waratahs
 Stephen Myler to  Ospreys
 Scott Steele to  Harlequins
 Tom Stephenson to  Rosslyn Park
 Ruan Botha to  Kubota Spears
 Ross Neal returned to  Seattle Seawolves
 Tom Fowlie released
 Brendan Macken released
 Conor Gilsenan retired 
 TJ Ioane to  Glasgow Warriors (loan)
 Bryce Campbell to  Austin Gilgronis
 Max Northcote-Green to  London Royals
 Dan Norton to  London Royals
 Sebastian de Chaves to  Austin Gilgronis
  Bill Meakes to  LA Giltinis
 Sekope Kepu released
 Sam Collingridge to  Richmond  
 Ben Meehan released
 Theo Brophy-Clews retired

Newcastle Falcons

Players In
 Mark Wilson returned from  Sale Sharks
 Matías Orlando from  Jaguares
 Marco Fuser from  Benetton
 Pete Lucock from  Doncaster Knights
 Tom Marshall promoted from Academy
 Will Montgomery promoted from Academy
 Cameron Nordli-Kelemeti promoted from Academy
 Ben Stevenson promoted from Academy
 George Wacokecoke promoted from Academy
 Tom Penny from  Harlequins
 Logovi'i Mulipola returned from  Gloucester
 Iwan Stephens from  Leeds Rhinos
 Louis Schreuder from  Sharks 
 Luther Burrell from  Warrington Wolves 
 Robbie Smith from  Bedford Blues
 Mateo Carreras from  Jaguares
 Santiago Grondona from  Jaguares
 Carl Fearns from  Rouen

Players Out
 Simon Uzokwe to  Ealing Trailfinders
 Josh Hodge to  Exeter Chiefs
 Johnny Williams to  Scarlets
 Dominic Waldouck retired
 Tim Swiel to  Stormers
 Sinoti Sinoti released
 Jon Welsh released
 Cameron Nordli-Kelemeti to  Jersey Reds (season-long loan) 

 Toby Salmon to  Saracens (season-long loan)
 Darren Barry to  Vannes

Northampton Saints

Players In
 Nick Auterac from  Harlequins
 Ollie Sleightholme promoted from Academy
 Connor Tupai promoted from Academy
 Tom James from  Doncaster Knights
 Nick Isiekwe from  Saracens (season-long loan)
 Shaun Adendorff from  Aurillac
 Danny Hobbs-Awoyemi from  London Irish
 Alex Coles promoted from Academy
 Samson Ma'asi promoted from Academy
 Oisín Heffernan from  Nottingham

Players Out
 Mitch Eadie to  Bristol Bears
 Ben Franks retired
 Will Davis to  Ealing Trailfinders
 James Mitchell to  Doncaster Knights
 Gordon Reid released
 Michael van Vuuren to  Ealing Trailfinders
 Cobus Reinach to  Montpellier
 Ben Glynn returned to  Ospreys
 Fraser Strachan to  Ealing Trailfinders
 Andy Symons to  Vannes
 Toby Trinder to  Coventry
 Jamie Gibson to  Gloucester
 Devante Onojaife to  Ampthill

Sale Sharks

Players In
 Sam Hill from  Exeter Chiefs
 Cobus Wiese from  Stormers
 Curtis Langdon promoted from Academy
 Matt Postlethwaite promoted from Academy
 Arron Reed promoted from Academy
 Gus Warr promoted from Academy
 Kieron Wilkinson promoted from Academy
 Manu Tuilagi from  Leicester Tigers
 JP du Preez from  Cheetahs
 Sam Dugdale unattached

Players Out
 Rob Webber retired
 James Williams to  Hartpury University
 Ciaran Booth to  Connacht
 Mark Wilson returned to  Newcastle Falcons
 Joe Jones to  Doncaster Knights
 Rouban Birch released
 Sam Dugdale released
 Teddy Leatherbarrow released
 Matt Sturgess to  Fylde
 Bryn Evans to  Hawke's Bay 
 Nic Dolly to  Coventry

Wasps

Players In
 Ryan Mills from  Worcester Warriors
 Alfie Barbeary promoted from Academy
 Will Simonds promoted from Academy
 Myles Edwards from  Oyonnax
 Levi Douglas from  Bath
 Lasha Jaiani from  Armazi 
 Marlen Walker from  Cornish Pirates (short-term loan)
 Alex Schwarz from  Cornish Pirates (short-term loan)
 Nicky Thomas from  Ospreys (short-term loan)
 Luke Mehson unattached

Players Out
 Billy Searle to  Worcester Warriors
 Charlie Matthews to  Kamaishi Seawaves
 Nizaam Carr to  Bulls
 Ashley Johnson to  Birmingham Moseley
 Tom Bacon to  Doncaster Knights (season-long loan) 
 Thibaud Flament to  Toulouse
 Antonio Harris returned to  Jersey Reds
 Myles Edwards to  Toshiba Brave Lupus 
 Levi Douglas to  Toulon (short-term deal)

Worcester Warriors

Players In
 Gareth Simpson promoted from Academy
 Billy Searle from  Wasps
 Tom Dodd promoted from Academy
 Matt Kvesic from  Exeter Chiefs
 Joe Batley from  Bristol Bears
 Alex Hearle promoted from Academy
 Nick David promoted from Academy
 James Scott promoted from Academy
 Beck Cutting promoted from Academy
 Kai Owen promoted from Academy
 George Merrick from  Clermont
 Marc Thomas from  Harlequins
 Chris Ashton from  Harlequins
 Kyle Hatherell from  Jersey Reds 
 Maks van Dyk from  Exeter Chiefs (short-term loan)
 Scott Andrews from  Cardiff Blues (season-long loan)
 Jay Tyack from  Cornish Pirates

Players Out
 Luke Scully to  Cardiff Blues
 Joe Taufeteʻe to  Lyon
 Ryan Mills to  Wasps
 Dean Hammond to  Ealing Trailfinders
 Jono Lance to  Western Force
 Luke Baldwin to  Dragons (season-long loan)
 Ryan Bower to  Leicester Tigers
 Callum Morris to  Stourbridge
 Michael Fatialofa released 
 Farai Mudariki to  Nevers 
 Scott van Breda to  Jersey Reds (short-term loan)
 James Scott to  Jersey Reds (season-long loan)

See also
List of 2020–21 Pro14 transfers
List of 2020–21 RFU Championship transfers
List of 2020–21 Super Rugby transfers
List of 2020–21 Top 14 transfers
List of 2020–21 Major League Rugby transfers

References

2020-21
transfers